Ninakku Njaanum Enikku Neeyum is a 1978 Indian Malayalam-language film,  directed by J. Sasikumar and produced by Thiruppathi Chettiyar. The film stars Prem Nazir, Jagathy Sreekumar, KPAC Lalitha and Sankaradi in the lead roles. The film has musical score by V. Dakshinamoorthy.

Cast

Prem Nazir as Balan
Jagathy Sreekumar as Babu
KPAC Lalitha as Thankamma
Sankaradi as Kurup
Sreelatha Namboothiri as Pankajakshi
Junior Ragini as Sarojini
Baby Indira as Young Sarasvathi
Baby Shanthi as Young Lakshmi
Kuthiravattam Pappu as Kuttappan
Meena as Bhargavi
Ravikumar as Gopi
Vanchiyoor Radha as Nun
Vidhubala as Sarasvathi
Bhavani as Lakshmi 
Pala Thankam as Hostel Matron Nun
Master Joe as Young Kuttappan
Master Sunil as Young Balan
Ambili as Rajumon

Soundtrack
The music was composed by V. Dakshinamoorthy and the lyrics were written by Chirayinkeezhu Ramakrishnan Nair and Pappanamkodu Lakshmanan.

References

External links
 

1978 films
1970s Malayalam-language films
Films directed by J. Sasikumar